Udhanwal is a village in Batala in Gurdaspur district of Majha Punjab state, India. Udhanwal is re-setup on the "THAE" by a Sikh sardar of Kalsi caste and he was also Ramgharia Risaldar in Sikh Khalsa Army of Maharaja Ranjeet Singh. Prior he was the resident of village Dhandoi near Batala. He re-setup his own new village Udhanwal along with another forty families of Sikh faith specially Kalsi peoples from the nearby villages of the Majha belt of panjab just before the death of Sher-e-panjab Maharaja Ranjeet Singh. The village is administrated by Sarpanch an elected representative of the village.

Demography 
, the village had 368 houses and a population of 2088 of which 1069 were males while 1019 were females.  According to the report published by Census India in 2011, 829 are from Schedule Caste and the village has no Schedule Tribe population.

See also
List of villages in India

References

External links 
 Tourism of Punjab
 Census of Punjab

Villages in Gurdaspur district